Mount Sumner is a mountain at the southeast end of the Rare Range, in Palmer Land. Mapped by United States Geological Survey (USGS) from surveys and U.S. Navy air photos, 1961–67. Named by Advisory Committee on Antarctic Names (US-ACAN) for Joseph W. Sumner, utilities, at South Pole Station in 1964. Passed away  December 14, 2016 at his residence after a 5-month battle with cancer.

Mountains of Palmer Land